{{Infobox comics character and title 

|code_name=
|image=Doctor_Fate_13_Cover_(Textless).jpg
|imagesize=
|caption=The Kent Nelson and Khalid Nassour incarnations of Doctor Fate.Art by Ibrahim Moustafa.
|publisher=DC Comics
|debut=More Fun Comics #55 (May 1940)
|debutmo=May
|debutyr=1940
| creators=Kent, Inza:Gardner Fox (writer)Howard Sherman (artist)Eric, Linda Strauss:J. M. DeMatteisShawn McManusKent V.:Steve GerberJustinianoKhalid Nassour:Paul LevitzSonny Liew
|characters=
|title=Doctor Fate
|cvr_image=
|cvr_caption=
|format=
|limited=Y
|ongoing=Y
|Superhero=y
|pub_series=DC Comics
|1stishhead=
|1stishyr=
|1stishmo=
|endishyr=
|endishmo=
|issues=
|main_char_team=
|writers=Immortal Doctor FatePaul LevitzVol. 1J.M. DeMatteisVol. 2J.M. DeMatteisWilliam Messner-Loebs Vol. 3Christopher GoldenVol. 4Paul Levitz
|artists=Immortal Doctor FateJoe StatonVol. 1Keith GiffenDave Hunt (cover artist)Vol. 2Keith GiffenDave HuntVince GiarranoVol. 3Don KramerVol. 4Sonny LiewIbrahim MoustafaTony Harris (cover artist)
|pencillers=
|inkers=Immortal Doctor FateMichael NetzerVol. 1Dave HuntVol. 2Dave HuntLovern KindzierskiVol. 3Prentis RollinsVol. 4Sonny Liew
|letterers=
|colorists=Immortal Doctor FateAdrienne RoyVol. 1Anthony TollinVol. 2Anthony TollinPeter GrossVol. 3John KaliszHeroic Age StudioVol. 4Lee Loughridge
|editors=Immortal Doctor FateE. Nelson BridwelNicola CutiVol. 1Dennis O'NeilVol. 2Dennis O'NeilStuart MooreVol. 3Peter TomasiStephen WackerVol. 4Brian CunninghamAndy KhouriDavid Wohl
|creative_team_month=
|creative_team_year=
|creators_series=
|TPB=Doctor Fate: The Blood Price
|ISBN=978-1401261214
|nonUS=
|cat=super
|altcat=
|hero=y
|villain=
|sortkey=Doctor Fate
|sort_title=Doctor Fate
|schedule=
|TPB2=Doctor Fate: Prisoners of the Past
|ISBN2=978-1401264925
|TPB3=Doctor Fate: Fateful Threads
|ISBN3=978-1401272418
|alliances=Justice LeagueLords of OrderJustice Society of AmericaJustice League InternationalJustice League DarkSentinels of Magic
|powers=*Various mystical powers gained through the magical artifacts (Helmet of Fate, Amulet of Anubis, Cloak of Destiny); powers typically include spell-casting, illusion casting, astral projection, etc.
Knowledge of the supernatural
|real_name=Kent NelsonEric/Linda StraussInza Cramer NelsonJared StevensHector Hall Kent V. NelsonKhalid Nassour
|aliases=FateLegacy of Fate
}}
Doctor Fate (also known as Fate) is the name of multiple superheroes appearing in American comic books published by DC Comics. The original version of the character was created by writer Gardner Fox and artist Howard Sherman, debuting in More Fun Comics #55 (May 1940). The character has appeared in various incarnations, with Doctor Fate being the name of several different individuals in the DC Universe as part of a sorcerous legacy with several attempts to revitalize the character.

In the DC Universe continuity, Doctor Fate was originally conceived as a force fighting against evil by the supernatural being Nabu, a cosmic being affiliated with the Lords of Order, Mesopotamian deities, and a chief enemy of the Lords of Chaos. Over time, Nabu instead empowered mortal agents to act on his behalf and the Lords of Order, the first being Kent Nelson, the Strauss family, and various others. Other versions of the character differ, acting as solely supernatural-based heroes, affiliated with the Lords of Chaos, or demon hunters. Several years after the New 52 reboot, DC Comics introduced its latest and second-longest-running incarnation, Khalid Nassour, the grandnephew of Kent Nelson chosen by ancient Egyptian deities and archangels. In the 2020s, the character was given magical apprentices in the form of his sidekicks Stitch and Salem the Witch Girl.

The Doctor Fate character has appeared in various incarnations across multiple forms of media based on both comic and original characters. The Kent Nelson incarnation has appeared in several media, such as the television series Smallville, in which he is portrayed by Brent Stait, and the DC Extended Universe film Black Adam, in which he was portrayed by Pierce Brosnan. In animated media, several incarnations of Doctor Fate have appeared in the Young Justice animated series; Nabu, Khalid Nassour and Kent Nelson's versions of Doctor Fate have appeared in the animated series alongside other original incarnations based on pre-existing characters such as Zatara, Zatanna, and Traci 13.

Publication history

 Golden Age 
The first character to debut as Doctor Fate was Kent Nelson, who appeared in his own self-titled six page strip in More Fun Comics #55 (May 1940) during the Golden Age of Comic Books. The character was created by writer Gardner Fox and artist Howard Sherman, who produced the first three years of monthly Doctor Fate stories. After a year with no background, his alter ego and origins were shown in More Fun Comics #67 (May 1941). Stories during the Golden Age included his love interest, Inza, who was known variably throughout the Golden Age as Inza Cramer, Inza Sanders,More Fun Comics #77 (March 1942) and Inza Carmer.More Fun Comics #78 (April 1942)More Fun Comics #90 (April 1943)

When the Justice Society of America was created for All Star Comics #3 (Winter 1940), Doctor Fate was one of the characters National Comics used for the joint venture with All-American Publications. He made his last appearance in the book in issue #21 (Summer 1944), virtually simultaneously with the end of his own strip in More Fun Comics #98 (July–August 1944).

 Silver Age 
Aside from the annual JSA/JLA team-ups in Justice League of America that began in 1963, Doctor Fate appeared in other stories through the 1960s and 1970s, including a two-issue run with Hourman in Showcase #55–56, two appearances with Superman in World's Finest Comics #201 (March 1971 and #208, December 1971); an appearance with Batman in The Brave and the Bold #156 (November 1979); and a solo story in 1st Issue Special #9 (December 1975), written by Martin Pasko and drawn by Walt Simonson. Doctor Fate and the rest of The Justice Society returned to All-Star Comics in 1976 with #58 for a two-year run ending with issue #74 and Adventure Comics #461-462 in 1978, and Adventure Comics #466 related the untold tale of the Justice Society's 1951 disbanding. During this period, Inza Cramer's name as such was amended.

 Bronze Age 
Doctor Fate's origin was retold in DC Special Series #10, and Doctor Fate again teamed up with Superman in DC Comics Presents #23 (July 1980), and featured in a series of back-up stories running in The Flash from #306 (February 1982) to #313 (September 1982) written by Martin Pasko (aided by Steve Gerber from #310 to #313) and drawn by Keith Giffen.

Beginning in 1981, DC's All-Star Squadron elaborated upon the adventures of many World War II-era heroes, including Doctor Fate and the JSA. The series ran for 67 issues and three annuals, concluding in 1987. Doctor Fate made occasional modern-day appearances in Infinity, Inc. in 1984, the same year which witnessed the 22nd and final annual Justice Society/Justice League team-up. Doctor Fate also made a guest appearance in a 3-issue 1985 crossover in the pages of Infinity, Inc. #19-20 and Justice League #244. Doctor Fate then appeared in the four-part special America vs. the Justice Society (1985) which finalized the story of the Justice Society, featuring an elaboration of the events of Adventure Comics #466 and a recap of the Justice Society's annual team-ups with the Justice League. In 1985, DC collected the Doctor Fate back-up stories from The Flash, a retelling of Doctor Fate's origin by Paul Levitz, Joe Staton, and Michael Nasser originally published in Secret Origins of Super-Heroes (January 1978) (DC Special Series #10 in the indicia), the Pasko/Simonson Doctor Fate story from 1st Issue Special #9, and a Doctor Fate tale from More Fun Comics #56 (June 1940), in a three-issue limited series titled The Immortal Doctor Fate. Doctor Fate appeared in several issues of the Crisis on Infinite Earths, after which Doctor Fate briefly joined the Justice League.

 Modern Age 
In 1987, the Doctor Fate mini-series was released soon afterward, featuring the debut of Eric and Linda Strauss, who would replace the character Kent Nelson as Doctor Fate after being seemingly killed off by the antagonist of the book. Later, DC Comics would release a Doctor Fate ongoing series focusing on both characters acting simultaneously as Doctor Fate, the first twenty-four issues written and drawn by J.M. DeMatteis and Shawn McManus starting in the winter of 1988. The series focused on magically aged up Eric and Linda acting as Doctor Fate under the guidance of Nabu, whom has inhabited and taken the identity of Kent Nelson. Despite their differences in personality and both Eric's immaturity and true age, Linda is portrayed as having feelings for Erica which are mutual. The Eric Stauss character was seemingly killed off later in the run, making the Linda Strauss character the sole Doctor Fate for a time. The character would also briefly become a permanent member of the Justice League International. Eventually, Linda and Eric's characters were dropped as Doctor Fate, the last arc of the story revealing their fates to have reincarnated into the bodies of Eugene and Wendy DiBellia while Nabu reincarnates in Eugene and Wendy's unborn child. In 1991, later issues of the series saw Kent's wife Inza take over as the new Doctor Fate with a different benefactor unlike her husband, starting with the 25th issue of the series Inza's tenure as Doctor Fate differs from Nelson in her focus on social class issues and inequality, using her powers to improve one of the poorest districts in New York City while defending it from corruption and genuine malevolent evil forces. The series ended with issue #41. Following Zero Hour, DC killed off both Kent and Inza and replaced them with a new character, Jared Stevens.

DC eventually replaced the existing Doctor Fate with a new character, Jared Stevens. Stevens was introduced in a self-titled series called Fate, launched in the wake of Zero Hour in 1994. The Doctor Fate character went through a radical redesign, dropping the "Doctor" title and gaining new weapons made from the previous related artifacts of Doctor Fate. Unlike prior depictions of the Doctor Fate character as a sorcerer, the character was instead cast as a demon hunter. Considered an unpopular re-imagining of the character, the series was cancelled after 23 issues in September 1996.  The character then starred in The Book of Fate written by Keith Giffen, which ran from February 1997 to January 1998 for twelve issues as part of DC's "Weirdoverse" imprint, rebooting the character's origins and adventures. In 1999, the revival of the Justice Society in JSA allowed the Doctor Fate character to be re-worked once more and subsequently killed off the Jared Stevens character.JSA #4 (November 1999). DC Comics. The next incarnation of the Doctor Fate character would come in the form of Hector Hall, the son of the Golden Age Hawkman and Hawkgirl. In addition to appearing in JSA, DC published a self-titled, five-issue limited series in 2003. The character was killed in the Day of Vengeance limited series in 2005 as part of the lead in to the 2005 company-wide event story, Infinite Crisis.

In 2007, a new incarnation of Doctor Fate, Kent V. Nelson, was created by Steve Gerber and Justiniano and serves as an attempt to revitalize the Doctor Fate character. Unlike prior depictions, the character is instead no longer rooted in Egyptian/Mesopotamian mythology and is disassociated with the Lords of Chaos and Order due to being killed off during Infinite Crisis. Gerber also stated his intentions of not directly contradicting previous runs while raising the subject as little as possible. The character was also the grand nephew of the original Doctor Fate, establishing a connection to the most recognized Doctor Fate. Due to Steve Gerber's death, the seventh issue was written by Adam Beechen using Gerber's notes. The final issue was written by Beechen, Gail Simone, Mark Waid, and Mark Evanier, who each wrote a different ending to the story. The character would appear in the Reign in Hell miniseries and in Justice Society of America (vol. 3) #30 (August 2009), featuring in the book until its cancellation with #54 in August 2011.

The New 52

Following the events of the Flashpoint mini-series in 2011, DC's continuity was rebooted. As part of The New 52 initiative, an alternate version of Doctor Fate named Khalid Ben-Hassin was created by writer James Robinson and artist Brett Booth. The character was featured in the Earth 2 ongoing series from #9 (February 2013) onwards.

DC You & DC Rebirth-onward
 
After the conclusion of the Convergence limited series in June 2015, DC launched a new Doctor Fate ongoing series, written by Paul Levitz and drawn by Sonny Liew as part of the DC You initiative, which saw an emphasis on "story over continuity", loosening the restrictions of continuity to allow for a diverse range of genres while some characters underwent status quo changes. The title focused on the newest and most recent incarnation of Doctor Fate, an Egyptian-American medical student named Khalid Nassour. Created with an emphasis on diversity and to take the character in a different direction, the biracial character's inspirations included Marvel characters like Spider-Man and Doctor Strange, the latter character having been influenced by Sonny Liew; Liew intended to depict a character entrusted with great responsibilities going through a journey of self-discovery in a world similar to the likes of Doctor Strange. The series also would re-introduce a rebooted version of the Kent Nelson character, depicting him as a previous Doctor Fate with some of his old histories intact and as a mentor figure. Both Khalid and Kent would simultaneously act as Doctor Fate, the former being his apprentice to prepare to fully inherit the role. The series ran for 18 issues from June 2015 to November 2016.

In 2018, DC launched a second Justice League Dark series written by James Tynion IV starring a new roster led by Wonder Woman. In this roster, Khalid and Kent Nelson were revealed to be eventual new members of the Justice League, originally acting as "advisors" in the team and became reoccurring characters. Nassour would eventually permanently become the new Doctor Fate instead of Kent Nelson in the "Lords of Order" storyline. Nassour would also receive a new redesign as Doctor Fate. Nelson's character would be later killed off in the "A Costly Trick of Magic" storyline, leaving Nassour as the sole Doctor Fate character in present times. While the original 2018 series was cancelled in 2020, the Justice League Dark series was instead re-purposed as a backup issue to the mainstream Justice League title, the backup issue written by author Ram V featuring a new storyline with Khalid remaining a reoccurring member of the Justice League Dark subdivision. Khalid would also appear in several title crossovers such as Superman, Teen Titans Academy, and The Flash.

In 2021, Khalid Nassour would appear in major storylines such as the Justice League Dark's "The Great Wickedness" storyline, depicting a status quo change in which the Helmet of Fate is damaged from a previous battle with the villain, Upside-Down Man, and is inhabited by a new entity. Connected to the Future State crossover event depicting an older Khalid Nassour having lived through the aftermath of the events of the "Great Wickedness" storyline, the entity is revealed to be the Egyptian goddess, Hauhhet. Nassour would also play a role in the Justice League/Justice League Dark crossover involving the return of the character, Xanadoth.

Incarnations
 Kent Nelson 

The first and original incarnation of Doctor Fate, Kent Nelson was created by Gardener Fox and Howard Sherman during the Golden Age of Comics Books. Known often as the primary and most well-known incarnation of the character, Nelson serves as both the main character and major supporting character to several of the Doctor Fate titles over the years. 

Born as the son of an archaeologist, Kent was an American of both Swedish and British descent who ventured with his father into a tomb in Mesopotamia, discovering the human body of Nabu but at the cost of his father's life. Nabu would pity the child and train him in the ways of magic before making him Doctor Fate, an agent of the Lords of Order. Kent would begin a superhero career specializing in magic and was a founding member of the All-Star Squadron and Justice Society of America as well as bonded with his partner and eventual wife, Inza Cramer. Later revisions to his history altered his relationship with Nabu, portraying him as an overbearing, controlling figure that manipulated a young Kent Nelson into being his agent while slowly supplanting his free will with his own. In modern continuity, he is succeeded officially by his grand-nephew and apprentice, Khalid Nassour.

Altered by Nabu, Kent possesses a level of immortality, invulnerability, and telekinetic abilities on his own.  In tandem with Nabu's artifacts, he gains potent spell-casting capabilities and magical powers, making him among the most powerful sorcerers of his time and the most powerful incarnation of Doctor Fate. He also possesses profound knowledge in the mystic arts, is a certified archaeologist & physician (the latter in some continuities), holding a doctorate degree in both.

 Eric & Linda Strauss 

The second incarnation of Doctor Fate, both Eric and Linda Strauss's characters debuted in Doctor Fate #1 in July 1987. Created by J.M Dematteis and Keith Giffen, the characters were created to replace the original incarnation of Doctor Fate.

Born to wealthy parents Rebecca and Henry Strauss, Eric Strauss was selected as a future agent of order, growing up aware of the existence of the Lords of Order and having a level of mystical awareness although it gave rise to an abnormal personality. He would have a bond with his future partner, Linda Strauss, whom became his step-mother after Rebecca committed suicide on account of the abuse she received from Henry. Soon, Linda herself was subjected to abuse at his hands but endured it for Eric, whom she found herself having a strange fascination with. At the age of ten, Eric was chosen as Nabu's next agent of order to inherit the Doctor Fate mantle, substantially increasing the boy's age in a similar manner to what occurred with Nelson before. This time Eric's mind did not mature. He would act as Doctor Fate alongside Linda, the two often merging in order to become Doctor Fate. Nabu goes on to possess Kent's corpse in order to personally advise them. Overtime, despite Eric's mind being similar to a child of ten years old, Linda developed romantic feelings for her step-son while Eric reciprocated such feelings.  Eric is eventually killed on Apokolips during a battle with Desaad, forcing Linda to become Doctor Fate on her own. Linda is killed soon afterward by the Lords of Chaos and the two reincarnated into new bodies, living out their new lives with one another. 

Together, both Linda and Eric mystically merge with one another to become a being called "Doctor Fate", the act causing the various artifacts (Helmet of Fate, Amulet of Anubis, Cloak of Destiny) to appear due to the artifacts operating as part of the merger. The dominant consciousness when merged determines the appearance. Their joint act as Doctor Fate is considered to be among the most powerful mystical beings on Earth although they lacked knowledge compared to their predecessor. Both Linda and Eric can also act independently as Doctor Fate, although they possess only half of their power.

 Inza Cramer Nelson 

Inza Cramer-Nelson (also Inza Saunders) debuted in More Fun Comics #55 in 1940, created by writer Gardner Fox and artist Howard Sherman. Originally, the character was created as a love interest for Kent Nelson, the original character to have starred as Doctor Fate. She would eventually become the fourth character to bear the Doctor Fate name and the second female character to become Doctor Fate.

In a scheme to lure in Doctor Fate, Inza was kidnapped by the scientific villain, Wotan. Inza and Doctor Fate meet, the woman enamoured with a life potentially filled with adventure and would accompany Doctor Fate as his partner. Eventually, Kent Nelson revealed his identity to her and she would support him when he became a medical doctor, accompanying him as a nurse. At some point, she also pursued a doctorate in archaeology similarly to her husband. Later, the two would marry, the magics of the Tower of Fate keeping them young. Overtime, their marriage became strained due to Nabu's influence on Doctor Fate and Inza coming to resent having to be in a passive role within the Tower of Fate, resulting in a loss of a social life. Despite later having some romantic feelings for another man, Inza ultimately remained faithful to Kent with intent on working through their marital problems.

Eventually, Inza and Nelson would be killed in the wake of the cosmic event known as kali yuga, the Lords of Chaos empowered and weakening Nabu, rapidly aging both of them and the strain being too much for Inza to bear. Eventually, Nelson too was killed and in the aftermath, the two would live out their afterlfie within the Amulet of Anubis for a time, the pair creating the life they missed out in their lifetime in the dimension, including a child. Eventually, the pair are resurrected into younger bodies and Inza becomes the sole Doctor Fate for a time, unable to merge with Nelson. As Doctor Fate, Inza's methods are more proactive although she becomes more reckless in their use, stemming a temporary separation from Kent. The two reconcile their differences upon learning Inza's patron as Doctor Fate originating from a Lord of Chaos, making her an agent of chaos.  The Chaos Lord revealing himself to have subtly influenced some events enough to cause the two to have strife against one another and enjoyed having the Lords of Chaos be a force of good, reasoning that even Chaos Lords did not find evil as favorable. The Chaos Lord would relinquish the powers bestowed to Inza back to himself although she would replace her chaos magic with magics stemming from life and continued acting as Doctor Fate, with Nelson acting alongside her.Doctor Fate (vol. 2) #26–32 (March 1991–September 1991) When operating as separate Doctor Fates, Inza wears the helmet and Kent's original costume while Kent wears the half helmet and costume he used in the late 1940s. Sometime later, the Nelsons and the JSA face the supervillain Extant during Parallax's attempt to change the history of the universe. Extant uses his time manipulation powers to rapidly age Kent and Inza to their proper physical ages. Extant also scatters the helmet, amulet, and cloak. The aged and depowered Nelsons then retire.After the New 52 reboot, Inza would make a minor appearance in a flashback, establishing her as Nelson's wife like the previous continuities. The flashback also implies her history being similar to her depiction in the Silver Age, Bronze Age, and Golden Age.

 Jared Stevens 

Jared Stevens debuted in Fate #0 in 1994, created by John Francis More and Anthony Williams. The character was created as the fifth incarnation of the Doctor Fate character. The characer differs from all other incarnations, having a radical re-designed and re-imagined as a demon hunter although the revisions to the character made it unpopular. The character's backstory was also revised twice, his original origin in the Fate comic title and the Book of Fate re-imagining his origin. 

After retiring, the Nelsons hire smuggler Jared Stevens to recover the helmet, amulet, and cloak from an Egyptian tomb. When the Nelsons try to collect the artifacts, they are murdered by two demons. During the battle, Jared attempts to use the amulet as a weapon, which then explodes and imbues him with various magical abilities and a red ankh-shaped scar over his right eye. Jared's injuries force him to use the cloak as a wrap for his right arm and to melt the helmet into a set of ankh-shaped darts and a dagger for use as weapons. After defeating the demons, Jared is contacted by Nabu, who attempts to make Jared the new Doctor Fate. Jared refuses and escapes, becoming a demon hunter using the alias "Fate". During his battles, he teams up with the supernaturally powered team of fugitives Scare Tactics, Etrigan the Demon and other forces to combat threats from the realm of Gemworld. Jared is later murdered by Mordru, who attempts to kill all the agents of the Lords of Chaos and Order and claim Fate's artifacts for himself. Jared's equipment reverts to its original forms and returns to the Tower of Fate upon his death. During the Dark Nights: Death Metal storyline, Jared is briefly seen among the superheroes that were revived by Batman using a Black Lantern ring. His appearance implies he was involved as an incarnation of Doctor Fate after the New 52  although the exact history has yet to be explained.

 Hector Hall 

Hector Hall first appeared in All-Star Squadron #25 (September, 1983) as the son of Golden Age heroes Hawkman and Hawkgirl, both characters whose stories include reincarnation as a central part of their fictional history. The character would eventually be reworked into the next incarnation of Doctor Fate in JSA #33 (October, 1999).

After Jared's murder, the mantle of Doctor Fate, along with a restored helmet, amulet, and cloak, is passed to a reincarnated Hector Hall. The Justice Society is reformed to protect the newly reborn Hector, who is being sought by Mordru so that he can use the boy's body to unlock the magical potential of Doctor Fate's artifacts for his own benefit. Hector's new body is the biological son of Hawk and Dove (Hank Hall and Dawn Granger), who are agents of Chaos and Order, respectively, which makes Hector an agent of balance instead of one side or the other. When the Spectre goes on a quest to extinguish magic, he banishes Hector and his wife to a snowy mountain landscape for all eternity, which they are only able to 'escape' by entering the Dream realm, although this essentially kills their bodies and means they can never return to Earth.

Like other Doctor Fates, Hector's possession of the Nabu's mystical artifacts makes him among the most powerful sorcerers in the DC Universe. Unlike incarnations preceding him, Hector mostly retains his agency even with Nabu inhabiting the helmet and doesn't require the use of ankhs when using his magical abilities. Hector is stated to potentially be the most powerful incarnations of all incarnations of Doctor Fate before him.

 Kent V. Nelson 

The latest incarnation of Doctor Fate prior to the New 52 reboot, the character debuted in the first issue of Countdown to Mystery in 2007 as an attempt to revitalize the character; unlike other Doctor Fates, the character lacks any connections to Nabu and either of the Lords of Order or Lords of Chaos, as the two factions were killed off in a previous storyline. In addition, the character's powers is not tied to any known mythology, making the Doctor Fate character exclusively a mystic superhero.

A psychiatrist and the grand-nephew of Kent Nelson, Kent V. Nelson would lose his status following his infidelity leading to a divorce, leading to depression and losing his license following negligent practices in the workplace. Eventually, the Helmet of Fate, seeking a new host, would choose him as the next incarnation of Doctor Fate. The character would become a member of the Justice Society of America, struggling with upholding the legacy of spell-casters with his initial lack of magical expertise.Justice Society of America (vol. 3) #35 (March 2010)

Kent V. Nelson possess the typical powers of Doctor Fate, allowing him to cast spells and perform various magical abilities through the Helmet of Fate. These abilities includes a half-helmet state, a "battle variant" (the classical costume of Doctor Fate), and can access a "library" of spells through the helmet despite lacking Nabu. In his early depiction in the Justice Society of America title, he was a novice sorcerer capable of casting general spells. Overtime, his skills became advanced enough to be hailed with the "Sorcerer Supreme" title. Additionally, Kent V. Nelson was a skilled psychiatrist prior to losing his license to practice.

 Khalid Nassour 

The current incarnation of Doctor Fate, Khalid Nassour first appeared in June 2015, starring in a Doctor Fate solo series, created as another attempt to revitalize the character, this time using the Egyptian-related background of the character. The character's journey & world would be inspired by Marvel Comics' Spider-Man and Doctor Strange and is notably one of DC Comics's first Muslim characters to headline a solo series. Unlike the other incarnations, the character's designation as Doctor Fate comes from both a cultural connection to Egyptian deities and a religious connection to archangels instead of Nabu.

The grandnephew of Kent Nelson through his mother's side and beginning as medical student, Khalid Nassour is an Egyptian-American who was bestowed the Helmet of Fate and named the next Doctor Fate by the Egyptian goddess, Bastet. An inexperience Doctor Fate, Khalid would eventually be apprenticed by both Nabu and Kent Nelson, both Kent and Khalid using the codename for a time. Eventually becoming a member of the Justice League Dark, Khalid would become the sole Doctor Fate in the final arc of Justice League Dark when Nelson perished in battle with Upside Down Man, having completed enough of his training to be considered one of the world's foremost magicians. Later, Khalid would be depicted as both a medical school graduate and a member of the Justice Society of America.

Khalid possess natural magical abilities bolstered by the Helmet of Fate and other associated items, including the Staff of Power. Initially, he was portrayed as a rudimentary sorcerer guided by Nabu and the Helmet of Fate's power. The character would later be apprenticed under Kent Nelson, his skills becoming more advanced and formidable. While his powers through the Helmet were initially provided by Nabu, Hauhet later becomes a patron of the helmet after it was damaged, granting him different powers; Hauhet's influences allows him to see the future at a cost of some of his sight although a possible future depicted its fully repaired state of allowing Khalid to  see and experience future timelines without consequence. Khalid is also a skilled physician, holding a medical degree.

 Powers, abilities, and resources 

 Mystical equipment, talismans, and weapons 
With access to certain mystic artifacts, most incarnations of Doctor Fate possess sufficient magical power to be considered to be among the most powerful practioners of magic on Earth in the DC Universe, said to possess abillities that makes them nearly considerably unstoppable.  In addition to the mystical talisman they possess, most incarnations of Doctor Fate are also led by a patron entity, the common being the Lord of Order, Nabu.

 Helmet of Fate 
The Helmet of Fate (sometimes called the Helm of Fate, Helmet of Nabu, Helmet of Anubis, Helmet of Thoth, or Helm of Thoth) is a magical Corinthian helmet that grants the bearer godly level powers and is considered one of the most powerful magical artifacts in the DC Universe. While most continuities establish it to be a creation of Nabu, the fourth Doctor Fate series presents a different origin, the helmet instead associated with Thoth and is presented with an altered origin, the object of power being rooted in the DC's version of Egyptian mythology; being a creation of Osiris and Thoth's hand, it was created in order to trap Nabu, who once served alongside Thoth for reasons not revealed.

In the original continuty,  the helmet acted as a reponsitory of magical power, granting it's wearer the power to manipulate magic and cast spells. The helmet also contains a vast library of spells from which the user can draw. Additionally, the helm possess an intelligence, whether derived from Nabu or otherwise, in which can incapacitate or mentally break those whom it rejects, typically preventing usurpers and villains from exploiting the helm for their own purposes (i.e Glorious Godfrey and Wotan). After the New 52, the nature of the helm's power change; the helm was instead created with Nth metal, granting it mystical properties, as well as some anti-magic properties against those of magical origin.  The helm additionally possesses the power to trap entities within its separate world and is both durable and capable of regenerating from damage. 

However, the Helmet of Fate is not completely impervious, as powerful entities (e.g., Arion, and Brimstone) have shown the ability to damage the helmet enough to require regeneration, showcasing a vulnerability to powerful forms of magic and applications from the Firestorm matrix. The helmet also can be overloaded with magical power, rendering much of its power inert; this happened during the A Costly Trick of Magic storyline, when Nabu and Nelson sacrificed themselves to create a spell powerful enough to injure Upside-Down Man, leaving Khalid's incarnation of Doctor Fate unable to call upon its powers.

 Patronage of the Helm of Fate 
Alongside the helm, some (though not all) incarnations of Doctor Fate also possess a patron. While commonly being Nabu, a Lord of Order, various other beings have come to inhabit the helm and sometimes grant powers. In addition to granting powers, patrons (with the exception of Thoth) also serves as guiding spirits comparable to that of a artificial intelligence. The patrons can act give advice to the bearer, reveal to them knowledge they possess, and act in ways to protect the bearer, including casting spells with intent on preserving them or warning them of imminent threats.

Conversely, however, only Nabu has exhibit being the only patron who often plots to usurp control of his bearers, often supplanting their will for his own and being the most well-known cost to bearing the helm with his influence upon it to the magical community of the DC Universe. Some Doctor Fate incarnations (such as Kent Nelson and Hector Hall) proved strong willpower can resist some of Nabu's attempted manipulations of their body and will. In recent continuities, the combined efforts of Justice League Dark and other magic users later barred Nabu form being capable of controlling his bearers and rendered him mostly immobile, with him now forced to have a bearerer who willingly bears the helm in order for him to act. This limitation remained until his disappearance after the defeat of Upside-Down Man, where he was later replaced by Hauhet as the guiding patron spirit.

 Amulet of Anubis 
The Amulet of Anubis (sometimes called the Amulet of Nabu or the Amulet of Thoth) is an amulet that was once bestowed to Anubis's most devout follower, being created by the death god himself. The amulet itself is automatically granted to those who bear the Helmet of Fate, bestowed to them alongside the magical cloak. The amulet affords several abilities, including resistance to psychic/astral probing, allows for mind control, and bolsters a user's magical power. While seldomly used by Doctor Fate himself, the amulet also allows for the wearer to call upon the decease spirits, allowing him to commune with spirits as well as houses its own universe  separate from the main universe, allowing the wearer to hide their existence or to trap powerful entities within.

The amulet's history was revised several times; in one story, the Amulet of Anubis was a powerful artifact forged by the Lords of Order at the dawn of time, being so powerful the Lords of Chaos formerly sought the artifact themselves. Eventually, it came into Nabu's possession to be granted to his chosen agent.

 Cloak of Destiny 
The Cloak of Destiny is a magical cloak with mystic properities; the cloak is both fireproof and highly resistant towards some forms of magic in the DC Universe; Jared Stevens notably used it to suppress the chaos magic that infected his arm.

 Other artifacts 
 Orb of Nabu: An orb-like device used by Doctor Fate in order to search for unknown threats, functioning similarly to a scrying glass. Despite its naming and Doctor Fate's association with magic, it is one of the few devices he uses not explicitly magic; the crystals that make up the orb are considered radio sensitive and react to his brain when in use. Though technological in nature, Doctor Fate often uses it and his magic in order to discern what is being hidden from them.
 Globes of Power: Magically constructed globes used by the Inza Cramer incarnation of Doctor Fate, created as a method of helping others without needing to directly intervene with other citizens during her tenure in New York. The globes are powered by Doctor Fate's magic and act in a similar manner to AI, able to perform simple magical fixes or alert her to threats requiring her attention.
 Staff of Power: A mystical staff gifted to Khalid Nassour's incarnation of Doctor Fate by Thoth powered by the blood of a pharaoh. It allows for energy projection-related powers. Only the Khalid Nassour version of Doctor Fate can use it due to his pharaoh lineage.

 Tower of Fate 
The Tower of Fate (also called the Fortress of Fate) is the magical dwelling bestowed to bearers of the Doctor Fate mantle. The tower acts as a nexus point of magic and reality on Earth. It has no doors or windows, being only accessible by magic. The inside of the tower appears as a twisted maze of stairways and hallways in which the laws of physics do not apply. The Tower holds a large collection of arcane texts within its personal library, including materials saved from the Great Library of Alexandria prior to its burning. In addition, the Tower itself possess mystical defenses, including once having a protector in the form of Typhon, a Lord of Chaos who was an enemy of Doctor Fate and later protected the Tower from intruders.

 Weaknesses 
Despite their powers, the characters possess several weaknesses dependent on the incarnations; some versions of Doctor Fate and their powers are centered around the helm, with removal of the helmet removing or limiting their powers severely. Some versions are also unable to cast counter spells that have been already cast, due to various rules of magic, able only to instead protect themselves from the effects.Justice League of America #148 (November 1977) Divine sources can also disrupt the abilities bestowed to Doctor Fate's incarnations, such their healing abilities.

 Supporting cast 

 Supporting characters 

 Supporting teams and groups 

 Villains and enemies 

 Villainous teams and groups 

 Other versions 

 Earth-2 
After Mister Mind "eats" aspects of the fifty-two realities that make up the Multiverse, one of them, designated Earth-2, takes on visual aspects similar to the pre-Crisis Earth-Two, such as the Justice Society of America being this world's premier superteam.

This version of Doctor Fate (based upon the Kent Nelson version of the character) along with the Spectre, suspects something is awry with Power Girl's mysterious reappearance.

 Flashpoint 
In the alternate timeline of the Flashpoint event, Kent Nelson works as a fortune teller in Haley's Circus. Kent tells his co-worker, trapeze artist Boston Brand, of his vision of Dick Grayson's death. The circus is then attacked by Amazons who are looking to steal the helmet. Kent is impaled and killed by an Amazon before the circus workers escape with the help of Resistance member Vertigo. With Boston's help, Dick escapes the Amazons' slaughter of the other circus workers and meets up with the Resistance, using the helmet as the new Doctor Fate.

 Earth-20 
An alternate version of Doctor Fate, known as Doc Fate, is shown to exist on the pulp fiction-influenced world of Earth-20.Final Crisis: Secret Files #1 (February 2009). DC Comics. Doc Fate is an African-American gunslinger and occultist named Kent Nelson who is based in a windowless Manhattan skyscraper. Doc Fate forms and leads a team of adventurers known as the Society of Super-Heroes, which includes the Immortal Man, the Mighty Atom, the Blackhawks and the Green Lantern Abin Sur.

In other media

Television
Live-action
 
 The Kent Nelson incarnation of Doctor Fate and his wife Inza Nelson appear in the Smallville two-part episode "Absolute Justice", portrayed by Brent Stait and Erica Carroll respectively. The Helmet of Nabu reappeared in the episode "Lazarus", wherein Chloe Sullivan uses it to locate the Green Arrow.
 Doctor Fate's helmet made a brief appearance in the Constantine episode "Non Est Asylum" as one of several artifacts stored in Jasper Winter's house.
 The Kent Nelson incarnation of Doctor Fate appears in Stargirl.

Animation
 The Kent Nelson incarnation of Doctor Fate appears in series set in the DC Animated Universe, initially voiced by George DelHoyo before Oded Fehr took over.
 The Kent Nelson incarnation of Doctor Fate appears in the Batman: The Brave and the Bold, voiced by Greg Ellis.
 Doctor Fate appears in Mad, voiced by Kevin Shinick.
 Doctor Fate appears in the DC Nation block on Cartoon Network.
 Several incarnations of Doctor Fate appears in Young Justice. This version features different origins for those who hold the mantle, some of whom are based on existing magic-related characters within DC Comics. Unlike the other incarnations of Doctor Fate, the mantle is the alter ego of Nabu, who became a Lord of Order.
 Nabu (voiced by Kevin Michael Richardson) was originally a son of Vandal Savage who was regarded in Mesopotamian mythology as Marduk and a god of wisdom before he was killed due to Savage's alliance with Lords of Chaos member Klarion the Witch Boy and spiritually ascended as a Lord of Order. Following this, Nabu must anchor himself to Earth via a physical host, whom he completely overwrites as a requirement for those whom bear his helm, and has taken many hosts over the succeeding millennia.
 Kent Nelson (voiced by Edward Asner) is a retired member of the Justice Society of America and mentor to Giovanni Zatara who ceased being Nabu's host due to its effects on Nelson's marriage. Despite being killed by Klarion, Nelson temporarily confines his spirit to the Helmet of Fate and grants it to members of the Team so they can use it for emergencies.
 While in possession of the Helmet of Fate, Team members Aqualad and Kid Flash temporarily take up the mantle of Doctor Fate before Nelson's spirit convinces Nabu to release them. After Zatanna dons the helmet to fight Klarion however, Nabu refuses to relinquish her until Zatara convinces Nabu to take him instead. As of season three, Nabu agreed to allow Zatara and Zatanna to reunite annually for one hour.
 In season four, Zatanna forms the Sentinels of Magic, which includes Khalid Nassour (voiced by Usman Ally) and Traci Thurston (voiced by Lauren Tom), to free Zatara and convince Nabu to alternate between all of them.
 The Kent Nelson incarnation of Doctor Fate appears in the Justice League Action episode "Trick or Threat", voiced by Erica Luttrell as a child.

Film

 The Kent Nelson incarnation of Doctor Fate appears in the opening credits of Justice League: The New Frontier.
 An evil, unnamed alternate universe version of Doctor Fate makes a cameo appearance in Justice League: Crisis on Two Earths as a lesser member of the Crime Syndicate.
 Doctor Fate appears in Lego DC Comics Super Heroes: The Flash, voiced by Kevin Michael Richardson.
 An original incarnation of Doctor Fate named Steel Maxum appears in Suicide Squad: Hell to Pay, voiced by Greg Grunberg. He was chosen by Nabu to become Doctor Fate for his fitness until Scandal Savage and Knockout betrayed him and stole a "Get Out of Hell Free" card from him. In response, Nabu ousted Maxum from the Tower of Fate for his recklessness and irresponsibility and replaced him with "some chick" according to Maxum. In the present, Maxum joins a male strip club as the "Pharaoh" before he is simultaneously confronted by the Suicide Squad and Professor Zoom and his henchmen, Silver Banshee and Blockbuster. While Silver Banshee knocks him unconscious, the squad retrieves and escapes with Maxum. After regaining consciousness, he explains how the card works before the squad leave him on the streets, where Zoom's henchmen catch him.
 A variation of Kent Nelson / Doctor Fate appears in Justice Society: World War II, voiced by Keith Ferguson This version is a codebreaker from Earth-2 who was active during his Earth's version of the titular war.
 The Kent Nelson incarnation of Doctor Fate appears in the DC Extended Universe film Black Adam, portrayed by Pierce Brosnan.

Video games
 The Kent Nelson incarnation of Doctor Fate appears as a NPC, later a playable DLC character, in DC Universe Online.
 Doctor Fate appears as a support card in the mobile version of Injustice: Gods Among Us.
 The Kent Nelson incarnation of Doctor Fate appears as a character summon in Scribblenauts Unmasked: A DC Comics Adventure.
 The Kent Nelson incarnation of Doctor Fate appears as a playable character in Lego Batman 3: Beyond Gotham.
 The Kent Nelson incarnation of Doctor Fate appears as a playable character in Injustice 2, voiced by David Sobolov.
 The Kent Nelson incarnation of Doctor Fate appears as a playable character in Lego DC Super-Villains.

Toys

 Several Doctor Fate action figures have been released, with most of them based on the Kent Nelson version of the character.
 The first Doctor Fate figure was released in 1985 as part of the second wave of Kenner's Super Powers Collection.
 DC Direct released another figure in 2000 as part of the Mystics, Mages and Magicians collection.
 A third figure was released with the Justice League Unlimited series (2004–2006) as a single figure and as part of three-pack collections.
 DC Direct released a fourth figure in December 2007 as part of its second wave of DC: The New Frontier action figures.
 Two Doctor Fate figures were released in April 2009 as part of the DC Universe Classics toyline: a Classic Kent Nelson version with regular yellow armor, and a "Chase" variant Modern Hector Hall version with gold accent armor and helm.
 The Batman: The Brave and the Bold toyline included a "Dr. Fate versus Wotan" two-pack set released in December 2009.
 The Imaginext'' "DC Super Friends" toyline included a Dr. Fate figure as part of their mystery package campaign in 2019. He was packaged with a snap-on lightning power accessory.
 At the 2004 San Diego Comic-Con International, DC Direct announced a full-size replica of Doctor Fate's helmet and amulet for release in 2005. The helmet was displayed with upcoming items during the February 2007 Toy Fair, but is still not available for purchase.

References

External links

Doctor Fate at the DC Database

Grand Comics Database: Doctor Fate entries
Showcase #55: The Glory of Murphy Anderson

 
Articles about multiple fictional characters
Characters created by Gardner Fox
Characters created by James Robinson
Characters created by J. M. DeMatteis
Characters created by Steve Gerber
Characters created by Brett Booth
Comics characters introduced in 1940
Comics characters introduced in 1987
Comics characters introduced in 1999
Comics characters introduced in 2007
Comics characters introduced in 2013
Comics characters introduced in 2015
DC Comics characters who use magic
DC Comics characters who can teleport
DC Comics characters with accelerated healing
DC Comics characters with superhuman strength
DC Comics female superheroes
DC Comics male superheroes
DC Comics superheroes
DC Comics fantasy characters
DC Comics titles
DC Comics deities
DC Comics characters who have mental powers
DC Comics telekinetics
DC Comics telepaths
Earth-Two
Egyptian superheroes
Fictional archaeologists
Fictional avatars
Fictional characters from parallel universes
Fictional characters who can turn invisible
Fictional characters with dimensional travel abilities
Fictional characters with healing abilities
Fictional characters with elemental and environmental abilities
Fictional characters with fire or heat abilities
Fictional characters with air or wind abilities
Fictional characters with earth or stone abilities
Fictional characters with water abilities
Fictional characters with electric or magnetic abilities
Fictional occult and psychic detectives
Fictional physicians
Fictional soldiers
Fictional necromancers
Fictional wizards
Golden Age superheroes
Mythology in DC Comics
Superheroes who are adopted